A roads policing unit (RPU), or a similarly named unit in some forces, is the specialist road traffic police unit of a British police force.

Responsibilities
RPUs work with the National Police Chiefs' Council roads policing strategy, Policing our Roads Together,
which has five strands:

 Casualty reduction.
 Counter-terrorism.
 Reducing anti-social use of the roads.
 Denying criminals the use of the roads.
 Public reassurance by high visibility patrolling of the road network.

RPU officers are responsible for patrolling the main motorways and large roads throughout the territorial police force area. In addition to their general road policing duties, they assist with various operations aimed at improving road safety and are also at the forefront in tackling vehicle crime and the criminal use of the roads network. They are also available to back up other units, as they are constantly roaming an area as part of their high visibility patrolling work.

A sub-unit of the RPU is the Collision Investigation Unit (CIU) or Forensic Collision Investigation and Reconstruction Unit (FCIRU), which exists to manage the follow-up investigations into all fatal and very serious collisions. The specially-trained teams attend the scenes of all such incidents, where, amongst other things, they take numerous measurements of the final layout of the scene and examine vehicles, all in a bid to piece together the cause of the crash.

Equipment

ProVIDA
The ProViDa In Car Video System is fitted to both marked and unmarked traffic patrol cars and motorcycles with the aim of improving driver behaviour and road safety. It is used to detect traffic offences and to educate, advise and, if necessary, prosecute offenders.

Components of the system:

 Colour video camera with pan and zoom control in the front and back.
 Video data generator which records date and time.
 Police pilot speed detection device and speed indicator (recording both police, and other vehicles speed).
 Mobile VHS video cassette recorder with a remote control unit. VHS is now being replaced with Digital Hard Drive Recorders or DVD recording systems.
 Two colour monitors, one each for front and rear seat occupants.

Whilst on patrol, a police officer who observes a blatant offence or an example of bad driving can record the incident on tape. Once they have stopped the driver concerned, they can then invite the motorist to sit in the police car, where the incident is replayed. A motorist can request a copy of the video evidence should the matter be dealt with at court.

Depending on the circumstances of the offence, the motorist can then be advised regarding their driving, cautioned or prosecuted, when the video recording can be used in court if necessary.

JAI PROVIDA 2000 is a sophisticated in-car video and speed enforcement system for 24-hour detection of traffic offences and criminal acts. System recordings can be used in court as visual evidence, including reconstruction of events.

VASCAR
VASCAR (Visual Average Speed Computer And Recorder) is a technology for determining the speed of a moving vehicle. It is used by police officers to catch speeding motorists. These devices are mounted on a patrol car's console, allowing the officer easy access to its controls. Many main roads in the UK now have horizontal lines of about two feet in length painted on the carriageway, which allow the VASCAR system to be calibrated.

VASCAR units were first fitted to police vehicles in the mid-1970s.

Automatic number plate recognition
The automatic number plate recognition (ANPR) system is housed in a mobile unit. Both colour and infrared cameras are used to capture images of vehicle number plates as they pass by. The index number is read automatically and checked against a number of databases.

If a match is made to a vehicle of police interest, the ANPR operator receives an alarm. The operator can then alert other officers to stop the vehicle.

Uniform

Traffic officers wear a white-topped or day-glo yellow peaked cap, and sometimes a white-topped bowler hat for female officers.

Traffic police in different forces
Most forces maintain their own roads policing unit, but the Central Motorway Police Group and North West Motorway Police Group allow some forces to collaborate through a shared service.

See also 
 Highway patrol
 Police car

References

Police vehicles
Types of police unit of the United Kingdom